Rhinecanthus is a triggerfish genus from the Indo-Pacific. They are found at reefs, and all except R. abyssus are restricted to relatively shallow depths. They are among the smallest members of the family, with no species surpassing  in length. They are primarily brownish, greyish and white, and have strongly contrasingly patterns in yellow, orange, blue or black. Adults of all have a relatively dark line (in most species intermixed with blue) that extends from the forehead down through the eye to the pectoral fin.

Species
There are currently 7 recognized species in this genus:

References

Balistidae
Marine fish genera
Taxa named by William John Swainson